Fuhrmannodesmidae is a family of millipedes belonging to the order Polydesmida. The family includes over 50 genera. This family includes three species (Hexadesmus lateridens, Agenodesmus reticulatus, and Eutynellus flavior) notable for being among the very few species in this order to feature adults with only 18 segments (including the telson) rather than the 20 segments usually found in polydesmids. This family also includes several genera (e.g., Cyclopsodesmus, Cylindrogonus, and Leigonopus) notable for featuring sexual dimorphism in segment number: adult females in these genera have the usual 20 segments, but adult males have only 19. Millipedes in these species arrive at these lower numbers of segments by going through the same stages of teloanamorphosis observed in other polydesmids but reaching maturity one moult earlier for 19 segments or two moults earlier for 18 segments.

Genera

Adisia 
Agenodesmus 
Assamodesmus 
Bactrodesmus 
Brachycerodesmus 
Cachania 
Caramba 
Chilaphrodesmus 
Chirripeckia 
Coonoorophilus 
Cryptogonodesmus 
Cutervodesmus 
Cyclopsodesmus 
Cylindrogonus 
Dendrobrachypus 
Eburodesmus 
Elgonicola 
Enantiogonus 
Esperanzella 
Eutynellus 
Fuhrmannodesmus 
Giustoella 
Glenniea 
Gyrophallus 
Hemisphaeroparia 
Heterosphaeroparia 
Hexadesmus 
Hingstonia 
Hypsiloporus 
Irazunus 
Irogonus 
Kukkalodesmus 
Lankadesmus 
Leiogonopus 
Mabocus 
Magidesmus 
Mecistoparia 
Megaloparia 
Nasodesmus 
Olmodesmus 
Oodedesmus 
Ootacadesmus 
Pachygonopus 
Phaneromerium 
Phreatodesmus 
Phylacomerium 
Physetoparia 
Pichitaria 
Pozodesmus 
Pseudosphaeroparia 
Salvadoria 
Schizotelopus 
Sholaphilus 
Sphaeroparia 
Sumidero 
Topalodesmus 
Trematodesmus 
Trichozonus 
Tylogoneus 
Typhlopygmaeosoma 
Venezuelodesmus

References

Polydesmida
Millipede families